The 2021 Malaysia Premier League is the 18th season of the Malaysia Premier League, the second-tier professional football league in Malaysia since its establishment in 2004.

First and second place non-feeder team will be promoted to the 2022 Malaysia Super League. The top 5 non-feeder teams will qualify for the 2021 Malaysia Cup.

Team changes

A total of 11 teams contested the league, including 9 sides from the 2020 season, 1 relegated from the 2020 Malaysia Super League, and 1 team formed by FAM and National Sports Council Malaysia (NSC).

To Premier League
Promoted from Liga M3
 No teams.

Relegated from Super League
 Felda United(disqualified)
 PDRM

New Team
 FAM-MSN Project

From Premier League
Promoted to Super League
 Penang
 Kuala Lumpur

Relegated to Liga M3
 No teams.

Expulsion
 UKM(disqualified)

Notes: 
 No teams from M3 League were promoted due to the 2020 M3 League season cancellation.
 Felda United's application for privatization was not approved by Football Association of Malaysia and therefore the team not qualified to participating in the league.
 FAM-MSN Project were a development team form by FAM and National Sports Council Malaysia (NSC) as alternative career pathway for the NFDP graduates. They took the spot left by Felda United.
 No teams from Premier League were relegated due to the FAM decision to keep the league teams at 10 following Felda and UKM expulsion.
 UKM FC registration was not approved by FAM as they failed to provide concrete proof of financial backing for the new season.

Stadium and locations

Note: Table lists in alphabetical order.

Personnel and sponsoring

Note: Flags indicate national team as has been defined under FIFA eligibility rules. Players may hold more than one non-FIFA nationality.

Coaching changes
Note: Flags indicate national team as has been defined under FIFA eligibility rules. Players may hold more than one non-FIFA nationality.

Foreign players
Players name in bold indicates the player was registered after the start of the season.

The number of foreign players is restricted to four each team including at least one player from the AFC country.

Note: Flags indicate national team as has been defined under FIFA eligibility rules. Players may hold more than one non-FIFA nationality.

Naturalisation players

League table

Positions by round
The table lists the positions of teams after each week of matches.In order to preserve chronological evolvements, any postponed matches are not included to the round at which they were originally scheduled, but added to the full round they were played immediately afterwards.

Results

Season statistics

Top goalscorers

Hat-tricks

Clean sheets

See also
 2021 Malaysia Super League
 2021 Malaysia M3 League
 2021 Malaysia M4 League
 2021 Malaysia FA Cup
 2021 Malaysia Cup
 2021 Malaysia Challenge Cup
 2021 Piala Presiden
 2021 Piala Belia

References

External links
 Football Malaysia LLP website

Malaysia
Malaysia Premier League seasons
1